Song sisters may refer to:

Song Ruoshen, Song Ruozhao, Song Ruolun, Song Ruoxian, and Song Ruoxun from the Tang dynasty
Soong sisters (Ai-ling, Ching-ling, and Mei-ling) or Song sisters, from 20th-century China
Song Hye-rang and Song Hye-rim from North Korea

See also
Sisters (song), 1954 song by Irving Berlin 
SisterSong, an activist organization dedicated to reproductive justice